The Banner Saga 2 is a tactical role-playing video game developed by Stoic Studio and published by Versus Evil. It is the sequel to The Banner Saga, and the second part of a trilogy of games.

A crowdfunding campaign for the third game in the series concluded on March 7, 2017, with 8,086 backers raising $416,986 of its $200,000 goal. A sequel concluding the trilogy, The Banner Saga 3, was released in July 2018.

Gameplay

The Banner Saga 2 builds on The Banner Sagas turn-based combat, adding depth with the introduction of new units, new talents, new enemies, interactive objects, and new objectives. It also introduces The Horseborn, a centaur-like race. Several heroes from the original return as playable characters, and many of the choices made in the first game have a direct impact in the second.  

In a 2015 interview with Rock Paper Shotgun, Stoic's writer Drew McGee noted that combat in the first game was often criticized as slow and lacking in diversity.  The development team therefore prioritized creating new enemies and enemy types for players to face, giving them new abilities and buffs while also adding more win scenarios and variations in combat. The range and scope of choices available to the players - both in combat and in the overall narrative - has also been expanded.

Development
The Banner Saga 2 is developed by three-man indie development team Stoic. The game was announced at The Game Awards on December 5, 2014. Initially, the game was scheduled to be released for the Microsoft Windows, PlayStation 4 and Xbox One in 2015. However it was later delayed into 2016. Windows and OS X versions were released on April 19, 2016, and PlayStation 4 and Xbox One in July 2016.

Reception

The Banner Saga 2 received "generally favorable" reviews, according to video game review aggregator Metacritic. GameSpot awarded it a score of 8.0 out of 10, saying "Like the original game, The Banner Saga 2 leaves you holding your breath, completely invested in the world, its inhabitants, and their struggles, anxiously eager for more." IGN awarded it 8.9 out of 10, saying "The Banner Saga 2 is as beautiful and tactical as the first, but with greater variety in combat and story." Hardcore Gamer awarded it a score of 4.5 out of 5, saying "Not only does The Banner Saga 2 meet every expectation that one could have following the first game, but it exceeds them in a number of tangible areas."

Accolades

References

External links

2016 video games
Android (operating system) games
Fantasy video games
iOS games
MacOS games
Nintendo Switch games
PlayStation 4 games
PlayStation Network games
Tactical role-playing video games
Video games based on Norse mythology
Video games developed in the United States
Video games scored by Austin Wintory
Windows games
Xbox One games
Video games set in the Viking Age
Versus Evil games
Single-player video games